Noel Joseph Henderson (10 August 1928 – 27 August 1997) was a rugby union player from Northern Ireland, who played in the centre position. Henderson played club rugby with North of Ireland F.C., was capped forty times for Ireland, and was a member of the British and Irish Lions team that toured in 1950.

Early life

Henderson was born in Drumahoe, County Londonderry on 10 August 1928. He attended Foyle College in Derry, and then Queen's University Belfast.

Playing career

His first appearance for Ireland came against Scotland in 1949 when he was 20 years old. He also played in the following game against Wales, where Ireland clinched both the Triple Crown and the Five Nations Championship. During the 1950 Five Nations,  Henderson made only a single appearance for Ireland due to injury, but was still included in the British Lions squad that travelled to New Zealand and Australia that year. He played in a total of 15 matches during the tour, including in the third test match against New Zealand where he played out of his normal position on the wing. The other matches Henderson played in were 10 tour games against local opposition in New Zealand, the match against the New Zealand Maori team, 2 tour games in Australia and an unofficial match against the Ceylon national team during a stopoff on the journey home.

Henderson played in all of Ireland's games in the Five Nations Championship between 1951 and 1955, with Ireland winning the Championship in 1951. In 1956, Henderson was made captain of the national team. Ireland recorded their first victory over a team from the southern hemisphere in January 1958, when they beat Australia during their tour of Europe. Henderson captained the side and with the scores tied at 6 points each, scored the try to give Ireland their win by 9 points to 6.

In his last game as Ireland captain in 1958 against France, Henderson switched position from centre to full-back. He finished his international career at full-back, playing all four games in the 1959 Five Nations championship in the position. Henderson's 40 caps for Ireland placed him fourth at the all-time international appearances list at the time of his retirement from international rugby.

Henderson played four times for the Barbarians invitational rugby team, against East Midlands in 1951, Cardiff and Swansea in 1955 and as captain against Swansea in 1956.

Post-playing career

Following his retirement from playing rugby, he continued to play a role as an administrator for his club NIFC and for the Ulster branch of the Irish Rugby Football Union (IRFU). He was elected president of the Irish Rugby Football Union for the 1990-91 season.

References

1928 births
1997 deaths
Irish rugby union players
Ireland international rugby union players
British & Irish Lions rugby union players from Ireland
North of Ireland F.C. players
Barbarian F.C. players
Rugby union centres